Alan Everest Brown (born in Malton, Yorkshire, 20 November 1919 – died in Guildford, Surrey, 20 January 2004) was a British racing driver from England. He took up motor racing in a Cooper, later forming the Ecurie Richmond team with Eric Brandon. He participated in 9 World Championship Formula One Grands Prix, debuting on 18 May 1952 and numerous non-Championship Formula One races.  He scored two championship points. He was the first driver to score championship points for Cooper and also gave the first Vanwall its race debut. After he retired, he fielded two drivers in the 1959 British Grand Prix under the team name Alan Brown Equipe.

Complete Formula One World Championship results
(key)

References

External links 
 Alan Brown profile at The 500 Owners Association

English racing drivers
English Formula One drivers
Racing drivers from Yorkshire
Cooper Formula One drivers
Formula One team owners
Formula One team principals
1919 births
2004 deaths